Durmenach is a commune in the Haut-Rhin department in Alsace in north-eastern France. It is one of the 120 villages that composes the Sundgau.

History
With the Treaty of Westphalia in 1648, Habsburg domination ceased and Durmenach became French.

The village was an important Jewish settlement in the 15th century. Most of the houses in the centre were built by Jewish families between the 16th and 18th centuries.

In 1826, the Jews still lived in 66 different houses. Durmenach still had 650 Jews out of 1,000 inhabitants at that time.

In 1846, the Jewish population represented more than 56% of village.

On February 29, 1848, the last antisemitic pogrom in France took place and it happened in the village and its surroundings. It is also called Juden Rumpel or Judenrumpell. 75 Jewish houses were burned. An odonym (Rue du 29-Février) commemorates this event.

After 1940, most Jews had left or been deported and did not return after the Liberation.

The Jewish cemetery of Durmenach dates from the end of the 18th century and at the time contained a thousand tombs, 300 of which are still visible.

See also
 Communes of the Haut-Rhin department

References
 Durmenach - Official Website

Communes of Haut-Rhin